Brazil Songs is a music record chart in the Brazil, compiled by Billboard since February 2022. The chart is updated every Tuesday on Billboard's website. The chart was announced on February 14, 2022, as part of Billboards Hits of the World chart collection, ranking the top 25 songs weekly in more than 40 countries around the globe. This is the first local Billboard chart in the Brazil since the discontinuation of the Brasil Hot 100 after Billboard Brasil ceased its operation for an undisclosed reason in January 2019.

The first number-one song on the chart was "Malvadão 3" by Xamã, Neo Beats and Gustah, on the issue dated February 19, 2022. The chart's current number-one song is "Nosso Quadro" by Ana Castela, on the week ending on March 18, 2023.

Methodology 
The chart tracks songs' performance from Friday to Thursday. Chart rankings are based on digital downloads from full-service digital music retailers (sales from direct-to-consumer sites such as an individual artist's store are excluded) and online streaming occurring in the Brazil during the tracking period. All data are provided by Luminate Data, formerly MRC Data.

List of number-one songs

2022

2023

References

External links 
 Current Brazil Songs chart
 Billboard charts 

Billboard charts
Brazilian record charts